The Secret of Queen Anne or Musketeers Thirty Years After (translit. Taina korolevi Anni, or Mushketeri tritsat' let spustya) is a 1993 Russian swashbuckler film directed by Georgi Yungvald-Khilkevich based on Alexandre Dumas' 1847-1850 novel The Vicomte de Bragelonne.

Filming began in the summer of 1990 and ended in the autumn of 1991. Sound and editing took place in 1992. The premiere of the movie took place only in 1994 on the first Ostankino channel.

The filming locations were Tallinn, Leningrad, Odessa and the Karakum desert, which is located on the territory of Turkmenistan.

The previous film - Musketeers Twenty Years After, the next one - The Return of the Musketeers, or The Treasures of Cardinal Mazarin.

Plot 
First episode. King of England Charles II asks King of France Louis XIV to help establish himself on the throne. However, Louis refuses him under the influence of Cardinal Mazarin. D'Artagnan, together with Porthos, captures the enemy of Charles — General Monk. At the same time, Athos takes out a million gold pieces, which the King of England also needs to fulfill his goals.

The second series tells us more about Aramis, who by this time had become a general of the Jesuit Order and Bishop of Vannes. He, together with the son of Athos, Raul, conspires against Louis. Aramis wants to rescue the king's imprisoned twin brother in order to exchange one for the other.

Cast

 Mikhail Boyarsky as d'Artagnan
 Veniamin Smekhov as Athos
 Valentin Smirnitsky as Porthos
 Igor Starygin as Aramis (voiced by Igor Yasulovich)
 Alisa Freindlich as Anne of Austria
 Dmitry Kharatyan as King Louis XIV and Philip Marchiali
 Ivar Kümnik as Drunken
 Anatoly Ravikovich as Cardinal Mazarin
 Alexei Yasulovich as Karl II
 Andrei Sokolov as Raul, Vicomte de Bragelonne, son of Athos
 Katri Khorma as Luisa d'Lavalier
 Yuri Dubrovin as La Schene
 Arūnas Storpirštis as Monk
 Pavel Vinnik as La Rame
 Yekaterina Strizhenova as Madlen
 Jüri Järvet as  General of the Jesuit Order
 Vladimir Laptev as Digbi
 Anatoli Stolbov
 Yana Poplavskaya
 Alla Budnitskaya as Duchess of Orleans
 Igor Mang
 Ivo Eensalu
 Vladimir Maltsev
 Alexander Zadokhin
 Oleg Rogachov
 Andriy Zay

References

External links

1993 films
Films based on The Vicomte of Bragelonne: Ten Years Later
1990s Russian-language films
Films scored by Maksim Dunayevsky
Cultural depictions of Louis XIV
Cultural depictions of Cardinal Mazarin
Russian swashbuckler films
Russian historical action films